3C 433 is a Seyfert galaxy located in the constellation Vulpecula.

References

External links
 www.jb.man.ac.uk/atlas/ (J. P. Leahy)

Seyfert galaxies
3C 433
Vulpecula